This list is of the heaviest European freshwater fish caught using the traditional angling method of rod and line.
 The criteria for inclusion on this list is that the species, weight, date and venue have been published by a recognized publisher with a genuine photograph and a link to that publication is referenced here. The list is intended to include all categories of coarse and game fish caught by sport anglers.



Current records

Previous records

See also
Angling records in the UK

Notes
Note 1 - European Eel (Anguilla anguilla) and European Sturgeon (Acipenser sturio) are listed as Critically Endangered species (IUCN) status  by the International Union for Conservation of Nature (IUCN). Any of these fish caught, must be photographed, then returned to the water immediately.

Note 2 - Siberian Sturgeon (Acipenser baerii) and Huchen (Danube salmon) (hucho hucho)are listed as  Endangered species (IUCN) status   by the International Union for Conservation of Nature (IUCN). Any of these fish caught, must be photographed, then returned to the water immediately.

References

Freshwater fish of Europe
Recreational fishing
Angling records